Statistics of the 1987 Cameroonian Premier League season.

Overview
It was contested by 16 teams, and Tonnerre Yaoundé won the championship.

References
Cameroon 1987 - List of final tables (RSSSF)

Cam
Cam
1
Elite One seasons